Cidade de Deus is a neighborhood in the city of Osasco (São Paulo, Brazil). It is known for hosting the headquarters of Banco Bradesco S.A., 
a major banking institution in Brazil. It was inaugurated on March 10, 1953.

See also
Banco Bradesco S.A.

References

Neighbourhoods in São Paulo (state)
Osasco